Carl Nielsen International Competition (Danish:  Carl Nielsen Konkurrencen) is a competition for classical musicians (violin, clarinet, and flute) held in Odense, Denmark in memory of the composer Carl Nielsen.

Overview
The competition was established in 1980 under the patronage of Queen Margarethe of Denmark. It became a member of the World Federation of International Music Competitions in 1981. Initially a violin competition, its first President was Henryk Szeryng. Later the competition added special editions for organists (since 1986), clarinetists (since 1997) and flutists (since 1998). At various times jury members included Max Rostal, Joseph Gingold, Norbert Brainin, Arve Tellefsen, Milan Vitek, Dorothy DeLay, Tibor Varga, Jean-Jacques Kantorow.

Since 2012, the organ competition is no longer part of the Carl Nielsen Competition, but is instead held as a separate competition. But the violin, clarinet and flute competitions have, 
after nearly four decades, established themselves as some of the most demanding and rewarding in the world, each offering winners the chance to launch a significant international career. From 2019, the Carl Nielsen International Competitions for violin, clarinet and flute will be held concurrently for the first time. Representing the 2019 competition as Artistic Advisors are three of the world's leading musicians in their fields – Nikolaj Znaider, Emmanuel Pahud and Martin Fröst.

Prize-winners

Violin

1980
1st Prize: Kathleen Winkler
2nd Prize: Per Enoksson
3rd Prize: Hozumi Murata
4th Prize: Adriana Rosin
5th Prize: Grazyna Skowron
6th Prize: Marius Nichiteanu

1984
1st Prize: Osamu Yaguchi
2nd Prize: Lenuta Ciulei-Atanasiu
3rd Prize: Johannes Søe Hansen
4th Prize: Jaroslaw Zolnierczyk
5th Prize: Jacob Friis 
6th Prize: Anne Yuuko Akahoshi

1988
1st Prize: Alexei Kochvanets 
2nd Prize: Heike Janicke 
3rd Prize: Joji Hattori 
4th Prize: Nicole Monahan 
5th Prize: Sigrun Edvaldsdottir 
6th Prize: Beata Warykiewicz

1992
1st Prize: Nikolaj Znaider
2nd Prize: Jennifer Koh 
3rd Prize: Pekka Kuusisto 
4th Prize: Ilja Sekler
5th Prize: Not awarded
6th Prize: Vladislav Adelkhanov

1996
1st Prize: Adele Anthony 
2nd Prize (shared): Malin Broman and Jaakko Kuusisto 
3rd Prize: Not awarded
4th Prize: Not awarded
5th Prize: Esther Noh 
6th Prize: Tamás András

1999
1st Prize: Leor Maltinski 
2nd Prize: Saeka Matsuyama 
3rd Prize: Mariko Inaba

2000
1st Prize: Masaaki Tanokura
2nd Prize: Dmytro Tkachenko
3rd Prize: Mikkel Futtrup
4th Prize: Mariusz Patyra

2004
1st Prize: Hyuk Joo Kwun 
2nd Prize: Erin Keefe 
3rd Prize: Ui-Youn Hong 
4th Prize: Judy Kang

2008
1st Prize: Hrachya Avanesyan
2nd Prize: Yusuke Hayashi
3rd Prize: Josef Spacek 
4th Prize: Eugen Tichindeleanu

2012
1st Prize: Olga Volkova
2nd Prize: Niklas Walentin Jensen
3rd Prize: Eva Thorarinsdottir 
4th Prize: Ui-Youn Hong

2016
1st Prize (shared):  and Ji Yoon Lee 
2nd Prize: Not awarded
3rd Prize: Luke Hsu
4th Prize (shared): Soo-Hyun Park, Ji Won Song, and Karen Kido

2019
1st Prize: Johan Dalene 
2nd Prize: Marie-Astrid Hulot 
3rd Prize: Anna Agafua Egholm 
2022

 1st Prize (shared): Hans Christian Aavik and Bohdan Luts
 2nd Prize: Not awarded
 3rd Prize: Eun Che Kim

Flute

1998
1. Prize: Karl-Heinz Schütz
2. Prize: Kazunori Seo
3. Prize: Henrik Wiese
4. Prize: Natalie Schwaabe

2002
1. Prize: Pirmin Grehl
2. Prize: Denis Bouriakov
3. Prize: Fruzsina Varga
4. Prize: Sarah Rumer

2006
1. Prize: Alexandra Grot
2. Prize: Lukasz Dlugosz
3. Prize: ex aequo: Marion Ralincourt and Grigory Mordashov

2014
1. Prize: Sébastian Jacot
2. Prize: Yukie Ota
3. Prize: Yaeram Park

2019
1. Prize: Joséphine Olech
2. Prize: Marianna Julia Żołnacz
3. Prize: Rafael Adobas Bayog
2022

 1. Alberto Navarra
 2. Seoyeon Kim
 3. Alberto Acuna Almela

Clarinet

1997
1. Prize: Spyros Mourikis
2. Prize: Igor Begelman
3. Prize: Carlo Failli
4. Prize: Anne Piirainen

2001
1. Prize: Alexander Fiterstein
2. Prize: Nicolas Baldeyrou
3. Prize: Jens Thoben
4. Prize: Sebastien Batut

2005
1. Prize: Olivier Patey
2. Prize: Olivier Vivarès
3. Prize: Björn Nyman
4. Prize: Vincent Penot

2009
1. Prize: Olli Leppäniemi
2. Prize: Christelle Pochet
3. Prize: Daniel Ottensamer
4. Prize: Balazs Rumy

2013
1. Prize: Sergey Eletskiy
2. Prize: Mathias Kjøller
3. Prize: Inn-Hyuck Cho
4. Prize: Pierre Genisson

2019
1. Prize: Blaz Sparovec
2. Prize: Aron Chiesa
3. Prize: Víctor Díaz Guerra

2022
 1. Oleg Shebeta-Dragan
 2. Anne Lepage
 3. Panagiotis Giannakas

Organ

1986
1. Prize: not awarded
2. Prize: Jesper Madsen
3. Prize: Kevin Bowyer

1988
1. Prize: Andreas Liebig
2. Prize: Kayo Ohara
3. Prize: Anne Nietosvaara

1990
1. Prize: Kevin Bowyer
2. Prize: Bine Katrine Bryndorf
3. Prize: Yuzuru Hiranaka

1992
1. Prize: Christopher Wrench
2. Prize: Stephen Farr
3. Prize: Christian Schmitt
4. Prize: Pascale Melis
5. Prize: Paul Theis

1994
1. Prize: not awarded
2. Prize: Rie Hiroe
3. Prize - Ex Aequo: Walter Savant-Levet and Marina Zagorski
4. Prize: Stefan Kordes
5. Prize: Frédéric Desenclos

1996
1. Prize: Hanne Kuhlmann
2. Prize: Veronique le Guen
3. Prize: Torsten Laux
4. Prize: Jin Kim
5. Prize: Heinrich Christensen

1998
1. Prize: Johannes Unger
2. Prize: Teilhard Scott
3. Prize: Torsten Laux
4. Prize: Samuel Kummer
5. Prize: Làszló Deàk

2000
1. Prize: not awarded
2. Prize - Ex Aequo: Sarah Baldock and Charles Harrison
3. Prize: Christina Blomkvist
4. Prize: Burkhard Just
5. Prize: Hedvig Dobias

2002
1. Prize: not awarded
2. Prize: Burkhard Just
3. Prize: Helene von Rechenberg
4. Prize: Katrin Meriloo

2004
1. Prize: William Whitehead
2. Prize: Clive Driskill-Smith
3. Prize - Ex Aequo: So-Hyun Park and Johannes Hämmerle

2007
1. Prize: Henry Fairs
2. Prize: Gijs Boelen
3. Prize: Daniel Bruun
4. Prize: Ruth Draper

2011
1. Prize: Philip Schmidt-Madsen
2. Prize: Timothy Wakerell
3. Prize: Simon Menges

References
Official website

Music competitions in Denmark
Violin competitions